Arran may refer to:

Places
 Isle of Arran, Scotland
 Aran Islands, County Galway, Ireland
 Arranmore, County Donegal, Ireland, also known in English as Aran Island
 Arran (Caucasus), or Caucasian Albania, a historical region
 Arran, Saskatchewan, Canada
 Arran, Syria, a village in Aleppo Governorate, Syria
 Arran–Elderslie, Ontario, Canada

People

Given name
 Prince Arran, semi-legendary founder of Caucasian Albania
Arran Brindle (born 1981), English female cricketer
Arran Brown (born 1985), South African cyclist
Arran Fernandez (born 1995), British mathematician
Arran Gare (born 1948), Australian philosopher
Arran Hoffmann (1902–1990), German sports shooter
Arran Lee-Barrett (born 1984), English footballer
Arran Pene (born 1967), New Zealand rugby player
Arran Steele (born 1975), English cricketer
Arran Stephens (born 1944), Canadian entrepreneur, author and philanthropist

Surname
Len Arran (born 1961), English composer of film scores

Other names
Earl of Arran (Ireland), a title in the Peerage of Ireland
Earl of Arran (Scotland), a title in the Peerage of Scotland
 Lord of Arran, in High Medieval Scotland

Ships
Arran (1799 ship)
MV Arran, 1953 Scottish ferry
MV Isle of Arran, 1983 Scottish ferry

Other uses
Árran, the Lule Sámi center in Drag, Norway
Árran (Sami publication), a news and culture magazine
Arran (carpet), a variety of Karabakh carpets
Arran (organization), the youth organization of the Catalan Independentist Left
 Arran distillery, in Lochranza, Scotland
 Arran, a fictional character in the game NightCaster
 Arran, a fictional character in the novel The Enemy

See also

 Aran (disambiguation)
 Arun (disambiguation)
 Arran whitebeams, three species of whitebeam from the island of Arran, Scotland